WIXM (102.3 FM) is a radio station licensed to Grand Isle, Vermont, and serves the Burlington-Plattsburgh area. The station is owned and operated by Radio Broadcasting Services, Inc. It airs a hot adult contemporary music format known as "The New Mix 102.3".

WIXM has an effective radiated power (ERP) of 20,000 watts.  While the station is licensed to a community in Vermont and has its studios and offices on Watertower Circle in Colchester, its transmitter is on Beartown Road in Beekmantown, New York, about ten miles north of Plattsburgh.

History

Early years as WWSR-FM "Stereo 102" & WLFE-FM country format
The station first signed on in April 1970 as WWSR-FM, the sister station of 1420 WWSR.  Its format was adult contemporary music using the automated "Hit Parade" service, calling itself Stereo 102. In the late 1970s, it dropped AC in favor of country music, using the call letters WLFE.

Active rock format and call letter change to WIER (2008-2012)
The station flipped from country music to Christmas music in November 2008, and on December 29, 2008, the station moved to active rock as Rock 102 "Pure Rock Radio" to go up against alternative rock station 99.9 WBTZ in nearby Plattsburgh, New York.

In January 2009, the station added The Todd and Tyler Radio Empire, a syndicated talk show based out of Omaha, Nebraska, to its morning schedule.

On March 1, 2010, WLFE-FM changed its call letters to WIER and rebranded as "102.3 The Wire".

Hot Adult contemporary format (2012-present)
WIER switched to hot adult contemporary as "Mix 102.3" on March 30, 2012. The station's playlist is listed on Mediabase (where rival WEZF is listed), but it is not on the add board.  The station plays only a few 1980s hits, much like its rival WEZF. On August 13, 2012, the station changed its call sign to WIXM.

References

External links

IXM
Hot adult contemporary radio stations in the United States
Radio stations established in 1970
1970 establishments in Vermont